A Qualified Subchapter S Trust, commonly referred to as a QSST Election, or a Q-Sub election, is a Qualified Subchapter S Subsidiary Election made on behalf of a trust that retains ownership as the shareholder of an S corporation, a corporation in the United States which votes to be taxed. A trust is eligible to hold S corporation stock if it is a Subpart E trust ("grantor trust"), a testamentary trust, a voting trust, a qualified Subchapter S trust ("QSST"), or an electing small business trust ("ESBT").

References

Taxation in the United States